is a Japanese manga series written and illustrated by Kazuki Takahashi. It was serialized in Shueisha's Weekly Shōnen Jump magazine between September 1996 and March 2004. The plot follows the story of a boy named Yugi Mutou, who solves the ancient Millennium Puzzle. Yugi awakens a gambling alter-ego or spirit within his body that solves his conflicts using various games.

The manga series has spawned a media franchise that includes multiple spin-off manga and anime series, a trading card game, and numerous video games. Most of these incarnations involve the fictional trading card game known as Duel Monsters, where each player uses cards to "duel" each other in a mock battle of fantasy "monsters", forming the basis for the real life Yu-Gi-Oh! Trading Card Game tie in. The manga was adapted into two anime series; the first anime adaptation was produced by Toei Animation, which aired from April to October 1998, while the second, produced by NAS and animated by Studio Gallop titled Yu-Gi-Oh! Duel Monsters, aired between April 2000 and September 2004. Yu-Gi-Oh! has since become one of the highest-grossing media franchises of all time.

Plot

Yu-Gi-Oh! tells the tale of Yugi Mutou, a timid young boy who loves all sorts of games, but is often bullied around. Whether it be cards, dice, or role-playing board games, he will take on challenges from anyone, anywhere.

As the series progresses, Yugi and his friends learn that this person inside of his puzzle is actually the spirit of a nameless Pharaoh from Ancient Egyptian times, who had lost his memories. As Yugi and his companions attempt to help the Pharaoh regain his memories, they find themselves going through many trials as they wager their lives facing off against gamers that wield the mysterious  and the dark power of the Shadow Games.

Development
In the initial planning stages of the manga, Takahashi had wanted to draw a horror manga. Although the end result was a manga about games, it was clear that some horror elements influenced certain aspects of the story. Takahashi decided to use "battle" as his primary theme. Since there had been so much "fighting" manga, he found it difficult to come up with something original. He decided to create a fighting manga where the main character does not hit anybody, but also struggled with that limitation. When the word "game" came to mind, he found it much easier to work with.

When an interviewer asked Takahashi if he tried to introduce younger readers to real life gaming culture referenced in the series, Takahashi responded by saying that he simply included "stuff he played and enjoyed", and that it may have introduced readers to role-playing games and other games. Takahashi added that he created some of the games seen in the series. The author stressed the importance of "communication between people," often present in tabletop role-playing games and not present in solitary video games. Takahashi added that he feels that quality communication is not possible over the Internet.

Takahashi had always been interested in games, claiming to have been obsessed as a child and remained interested in them as an adult. In a game, he considered the player to become a hero. He decided to base the Yu-Gi-Oh! series around such games and used this idea as the premise; Yugi was a weak childish boy, who became a hero when he played games. With friendship being one of the major themes of Yu-Gi-Oh!, he based the names of the two major characters "Yūgi" and "Jōnouchi" on the Japanese word yūjō, which means "friendship". Henshin, the ability to turn into something or someone else, is something Takahashi believed all children dreamed of. He considered Yugi's "henshin" Dark Yugi, a savvy, invincible games player, to be a big appeal to children.

Takahashi said that the card game held the strongest influence in the manga, because it "happened to evoke the most response" from readers. Prior to that point, Takahashi did not plan for the card game to make more than two appearances.

Takahashi said that the "positive message" for readers of the series is that each person has a "strong hidden part" (like "human potential") within himself or herself, and when one finds hardship, the "hidden part" can emerge if one believes in him/herself and in his/her friends. Takahashi added that this is "a pretty consistent theme."

The editor of the English version, Jason Thompson, said that the licensing of the Yu-Gi-Oh! manga had not been entirely coordinated, so Viz decided to use many of the original character names and to "keep it more or less violent and gory." Thompson said that the manga "was almost unchanged from the Japanese original." Because the core fanbase of the series was, according to Thompson, "8-year-old boys (and a few incredible fangirls)," and because the series had little interest from "hardcore, Japanese-speaking fans, the kind who run scanlation sites and post on messageboards" as the series was perceived to be "too mainstream," the Viz editors allowed Thompson "a surprising amount of leeway with the translation." Thompson said he hoped that he did not "abuse" the leeway he was given. In a 2004 interview, the editors of the United States Shonen Jump mentioned that Americans were surprised when reading the stories in Volumes 1 through 7, as they had not appeared on television as a part of the Yu-Gi-Oh! Duel Monsters anime. Takahashi added "The story is quite violent, isn't it? [laughs]"

The English language release by 4Kids has been subject to censorship to make it more appropriate for children, for example mentions of death or violence were replaced by references to "being sent to the Shadow Realm".

Additionally, the character names "Yūgi" and "Jōnouchi" are based on the word . Yūjō is pointed out by Jōnouchi to Yūgi at the end of the first manga chapter, as "something visible yet invisible" (what's visible is the two of them, what's invisible is their friendship), as a way to tell Yūgi that he wants to be his friend. The pun was represented with a Yu-Gi-Oh! Trading Card Game card titled .

Publication

Written and illustrated by Kazuki Takahashi, Yu-Gi-Oh! was serialized in Shueisha's shōnen manga magazine Weekly Shōnen Jump from September 30, 1996, to March 8, 2004. Shueisha collected its chapters in thirty-eight tankōbon volumes, released from March 4, 1997, to June 4, 2004. Shueisha republished its chapters in twenty-two bunkoban volumes from April 18, 2007, to March 18, 2008.

In North America, the manga was licensed by Viz Media. They started publishing it in their Shonen Jump magazine from November 2000 to November 2007. They also released the manga in volumes, divided in three series; the first series, Yu-Gi-Oh!, includes the first seven volumes, and were released from May 7, 2003; to December 7, 2004. the second series, Yu-Gi-Oh!: Duelist includes the original volumes 8–31, and Yu-Gi-Oh!: Millenium World, includes the original volumes 32–38. Both series started publication in 2005; The first volume of Duelist was released on February 1, and the first volume of Millenium World on August 2. The 24th and last volume of Duelist was released on December 4, 2007, and the 7th and last volume of Millenium World was released on February 5, 2008. Viz Media republished the series in thirteen three-in-one volume edition from February 3, 2015, to February 6, 2018.

Other media

Yu-Gi-Oh! R

A spin-off manga titled Yu-Gi-Oh! R was illustrated by Akira Ito under Takahashi's supervision. The story is of disputed canonicity and takes place in the original manga's universe, between the Battle City and Millennium World arcs, where Yugi and his friends must stop a man named Yako Tenma who plans to use Anzu Mazaki's body to revive the deceased Pegasus. The spin-off was serialized in V-Jump between April 21, 2004 and December 21, 2007 and was compiled into five tankōbon volumes. Viz Media released the series in North America between 2009 and 2010.

Anime

Anime franchise overview

Yu-Gi-Oh! (1998 TV series)

The first Yu-Gi-Oh! anime adaptation was produced by Toei Animation and aired on TV Asahi between April 4, 1998 and October 10, 1998, running for 27 episodes and one theatrical movie released on the 6th March, 1999. This adaptation was never released outside Japan.

This series is heavily abridged from the manga, skipping many chapters, and often changes details of the manga stories it does adapt, featuring several key differences from the manga. It also adds a new regular character to the group, Miho Nosaka, who was originally a one-shot minor character in the manga. This adaptation is not related to any other works in the franchise.

Duel Monsters (2000 TV series)

Yu-Gi-Oh! Duel Monsters, known outside Japan as simply Yu-Gi-Oh!, is the second adaptation of the series. It was produced by Nihon Ad Systems and TV Tokyo, while animation for the show was done by Studio Gallop. Loosely adapting the manga from chapter sixty onwards, the series features several differences from the manga and the Toei-produced series and largely focuses around the game of Duel Monsters, tying in with the real life Yu-Gi-Oh! Trading Card Game. The series aired in Japan on TV Tokyo between April 18, 2000 and September 29, 2004, running for 224 episodes. A remastered version of the series, focusing on specific duels, began airing in Japan from February 7, 2015.

In April 2001, 4Kids Entertainment obtained the merchandising and television rights to the series from Nihon Ad Systems, producing an English-language version which aired in North America on Kids' WB! between September 29, 2001 and June 10, 2006, also releasing in various countries outside Japan. The adaptation received many changes from the Japanese version to tailor it for international audiences. These include different names for many characters and monsters, changes to the appearance of the cards to differentiate them from their real-life counterparts and various cuts and edits pertaining to violence, death, and religious references to make the series suitable for children.

An album containing some tracks from the English dub music entitled Yu-Gi-Oh! Music to Duel By was released on October 29, 2002 on DreamWorks Records on Audio CD and Compact Cassette.

An uncut version, featuring an all-new English dub track and the original Japanese audio, began release in October 2004, in association with Funimation Entertainment. Only three volumes, comprising the first nine episodes, were ever released. 4Kids would later release the uncut Japanese episodes on YouTube, in May 2009, but were forced to stop due to legal issues with ADK and Yugi's Japanese voice actor, Shunsuke Kazama. Meanwhile, a separate English adaptation, produced by A.S.N., aired in South East Asia. The names were also Americanized, but the series setting and the original music remained intact.

On March 24, 2011, TV Tokyo and Nihon Ad Systems filed a joint lawsuit against 4Kids, accusing them of underpayments concerning the Yu-Gi-Oh! franchises and allegedly conspiring with Funimation, and have allegedly terminated their licensing deal with them. This led to 4Kids filing for protection under Chapter 11 of the U.S. Bankruptcy code. Although 4Kids had managed to win the case in March 2012, they ended up selling their rights to the franchise, among other assets, to Konami. Konami currently distributes the series and its spin-offs, in addition to producing English dubs through its renamed subsidiary, 4K Media Inc.

A complete DVD boxset, including all English episodes and the Bonds Beyond Time movie, was released on July 15, 2014 via Amazon.
On July 11, 2015, 4K Media began releasing subtitled episodes to  the Crunchyroll streaming site monthly.

Capsule Monsters

Yu-Gi-Oh! Capsule Monsters is a twelve-episode spin-off miniseries commissioned, produced and edited by 4Kids Entertainment, which aired in North America between September 9, 2006 and November 25, 2006. It is set before the end of Yu-Gi-Oh! Duel Monsters, apparently somewhere between episodes 198 and 199, and involves Yugi and his friends being pulled into a world filled with real Duel Monsters they can summon using capsules. It is similar to the Virtual RPG arc in many respects, but it does not seem to have anything to do with the early Capsule Monster Chess game featured in early volumes of the original manga. It is currently the only animated Yu-Gi-Oh! media not to be released in Japan, though it is referred to as Yu-Gi-Oh! ALEX. A DVD containing a condensed version of the Capsule Monsters episodes was released in May 2006.

Novel
A novel adaptation of some of the beginning parts of the manga and the Death-T arc, written by Katsuhiko Chiba (千葉 克彦 Chiba Katsuhiko). It was published in Japan by Shueisha on September 3, 1999 and has four sections. The fourth section is an original story, occurring only in the novel. Two weeks after Yugi's battle with Kaiba in Death-T, Yugi gets a call from Kaiba, who tells him to meet for a game at the top floor of Kaiba Corporation. Yugi accepts, and when the game begins, they use a special variation of Magic & Wizards called the "Bingo Rule," which prevents the used of a specific card in each player's deck. Mokuba stumbles in on them, and tells Yugi that Kaiba has not yet awoken from his catatonic state. It turns out that the Kaiba that Yugi is playing against is a "Cyber Kaiba", controlled by the KaibaCorp computer, using all of Kaiba's memories.

Other books

 is a guidebook written by Kazuki Takahashi related to characters from the original Yu-Gi-Oh! manga universe. It was published in Japan on November 1, 2002 by Shueisha under their Jump Comics imprint and in France on December 12, 2006 by Kana. The book contains profiles for characters, including information which has never been released elsewhere, including birth dates, height, weight, blood type, favorite and least favorite food. It also contains a plethora of compiled information from the story, including a list of names for the various games and Shadow Games that appear in Yu-Gi-Oh! and the various Penalty Games used by the Millennium Item wielders.

An art book titled,  was illustrated by Kazuki Takahashi under the Studio Dice label. The art book was released on December 16, 2011 and contains a number of illustrations done for the bunkoban releases of the manga, compilations of color illustrations found in the manga, and brand new art drawn for the book. It also contains pictures by Takahashi used for cards with the anniversary layout, pictures he has posted on his website and a number of other original illustrations. Udon Press published an English version, translated by Caleb D. Cook.

The  was released in May 1999 following the release of Toei's Yu-Gi-Oh! movie earlier that year. The book includes episode information and pictures regarding the first Yu-Gi-Oh! anime and movie, some pictures with the original manga with a section covering the making of certain monsters, and interviews regarding the first film. It also features an ani-manga version of the Yu-Gi-Oh! movie and is the only supplemental work released for Toei's version of the anime.

The  is a book released to celebrate the tenth anniversary of the NAS adaption of the anime (as opposed to the manga), released on January 21, 2010. The book features scenes from the crossover movie, Yu-Gi-Oh! 3D Bonds Beyond Time, a quick review of the three Yu-Gi-Oh! Duel Monsters series, character profiles, duels and interviews with the staff of the movie. A fold-out double-sided poster is included with the book.

Yu-Gi-Oh! Official Card Game Duel Monsters Official Rule Guide — The Thousand Rule Bible - , This is a rule book and strategy guide for the Junior and Shin Expert rules. This also has a Q & A related to certain cards, and the book comes with the "multiply" card.
Yu-Gi-Oh! Official Card Game Duel Monsters Official Card Catalog The Valuable Book - This is a collection of card catalogues.
Volume 1 
Volume 2 
Volume 3 
Volume 4 
Volume 5 
Yu-Gi-Oh!: Monster Duel Official Handbook by Michael Anthony Steele - , Published by Scholastic Press - A guide book to Yu-Gi-Oh! cards and characters
Yu-Gi-Oh! Enter the Shadow Realm: Mighty Champions by Jeff O'Hare - , Published by Scholastic Press - A book with puzzles and games related to Yu-Gi-Oh!

Films
Four animated films based on the franchise have been released.

Yu-Gi-Oh! (1999)
Based on the Toei animated series, the thirty-minute movie revolves around a boy named Shōgo Aoyama, who is targeted by Seto Kaiba after obtaining a powerful rare card; the legendary Red-Eyes Black Dragon. The movie was released by Toei Company in theaters on March 6, 1999 and on VHS on November 21, 1999.

Yu-Gi-Oh! The Movie: Pyramid of Light

Yu-Gi-Oh! The Movie: Pyramid of Light, often referred to as simply Yu-Gi-Oh! The Movie, was first released in North America on August 13, 2004. The movie was developed specifically for Western audiences by 4Kids based on the overwhelming success of the Yu-Gi-Oh! franchise in the United States. Warner Bros. distributed the film in most English-speaking countries. Its characters are from the Yu-Gi-Oh! Duel Monsters anime. In the movie, which takes place following the Battle City arc, Yugi faces Anubis, the Egyptian God of the Dead. An extended uncut Japanese version of the movie premiered in special screenings in Japan on November 3, 2004 under the title Yu-Gi-Oh! Duel Monsters: Pyramid of Light. The movie was then aired on TV Tokyo on January 2, 2005. Attendees of the movie during its premiere (United States or Japan) got 1 of 4 free Yu-Gi-Oh! Trading Card Game cards. The cards were Pyramid of Light, Sorcerer of Dark Magic, Blue Eyes Shining Dragon, and Watapon. The Home Video Release also gave out one of the free cards with an offer to get all four cards by mail (though the promotion ended in December 2004). In Australia, New Zealand, Germany and the United Kingdom, free promotional cards were also given out, however, they were given out at all screenings of the movie, and not just the premiere.

Yu-Gi-Oh!: Bonds Beyond Time

10th Anniversary Yu-Gi-Oh! Movie: Super Fusion! Bonds that Transcend Time, is a 3-D film released on January 23, 2010 in Japan. The film was released in North America by 4Kids on February 26, 2011 under the name Yu-Gi-Oh! 3D: Bonds Beyond Time with additional footage, where it also received an encore screening in Japan. The movie celebrates the 10th anniversary of the first NAS series (as opposed to the anniversary of the manga) and features an original storyline involving Yugi Mutou, Jaden Yuki from Yu-Gi-Oh! GX, and Yusei Fudo from Yu-Gi-Oh! 5D's, fighting against a new enemy named Paradox. It was first teased with short animations featured at the start of episodes of Yu-Gi-Oh! 5D's during episodes 65–92. The film was released on Blu-ray Disc and DVD in July 2011, with the UK release by Manga Entertainment being the first bilingual release of the franchise since the Uncut Yu-Gi-Oh! DVDs.

Yu-Gi-Oh!: The Dark Side of Dimensions

4K Media announced that a new film was in development in Japan, celebrating Yu-Gi-Oh's 20th anniversary. The film features an original story by Kazuki Takahashi, set six months after the events of the manga, depicting a duel between Yugi and Kaiba, as well as a new adversary. The film was released on April 23, 2016 in Japan and had an international release in late 2016. The film released on DVD and Blu-ray on March 8, 2017 in Japan, and included the two part manga prequel called Yu-Gi-Oh!: Transcend Game. The film was released in the United States on January 27, 2017, and was made available on DVD and Blu-ray on June 27, 2017.

Spinoffs

Yu-Gi-Oh! GX

Yu-Gi-Oh! GX, known in Japan as Yu-Gi-Oh! Duel Monsters GX, is the first spin-off anime series produced by NAS which ran for 180 episodes from October 6, 2004 and March 26, 2008. Taking place a few years after the events of Yu-Gi-Oh! Duel Monsters, the series follows a boy named Jaden Yuki as he attends a Duel Academy, built by Seto Kaiba, in the hopes of becoming the next Duel King. Like the previous seasons, 4Kids Entertainment licensed the series outside Japan and aired it in North America between October 10, 2005 and July 12, 2008, though episodes 157–180 were not dubbed.

A manga adaptation by Naoyuki Kageyama was serialized in Shueisha's V-Jump magazine between December 17, 2005 and March 19, 2011. The manga differs from that of the anime, featuring new storylines and monsters, as well as some personality changes in some of the characters. The series is published in North America by Viz Media.

Yu-Gi-Oh! 5D's

Yu-Gi-Oh! 5D's is the second main spin-off series also taking place in the 2000 universe, which aired for 154 episodes between April 2, 2008 and March 30, 2011. It was later licensed by 4Kids and aired in North America between September 13, 2008 and September 10, 2011. This series focuses around a motorcycling duelist named Yusei Fudo and introduces new concepts such as Turbo Duels, duels which take place upon motorbikes called Duel Runners, and Synchro Monsters, which were also added to the real life trading card game.

A manga adaptation by Masahiro Hikokubo and Satou Masashi began serialization in V-Jump from August 2009 and, like the GX manga, differs from the anime in storyline and characterization. The manga is also published in North America by Viz Media.

Yu-Gi-Oh! Zexal

Yu-Gi-Oh! Zexal is the third main spin-off series, which aired in Japan between April 11, 2011 and March 23, 2014, which aired for 146 episodes. The first series aired between April 11, 2011 and September 24, 2012. The story revolves around a boy named Yuma Tsukumo who, joined by an interstellar being known as Astral, must gather the 100 Numbers cards that make up his memory. The series adds yet another monster type, Xyz Monsters, which were added to the trading card game. 4Kids licensed the series and began airing the series in North America on The CW's Toonzai block from October 15, 2011. After a legal battle with TV Tokyo and NAS caused 4Kids to file for bankruptcy, Konami received the rights to the series. The series aired on Saban's Vortexx block, with production done by 4K Media Inc. A second series, titled Yu-Gi-Oh! Zexal II, aired in Japan between October 7, 2012 and March 23, 2014.

The manga adaptation written by Shin Yoshida and illustrated by Naoto Miyashi, began serialization in the extended February 2011 issue of Shueisha's V Jump magazine, released on December 18, 2010.

Yu-Gi-Oh! Arc-V

Yu-Gi-Oh! Arc-V is the fourth main spin-off series, which aired for 148 episodes between April 6, 2014 and March 26, 2017, following Yu-Gi-Oh! Zexal. The series focuses on a new protagonist, Yūya Sakaki, who participates in the world of Action Duels, in which enhanced Solid Vision systems give substance to monsters and environments. The series introduces Pendulum Monsters and Pendulum Summoning, which were added to the trading card game.

Yu-Gi-Oh! VRAINS

Yu-Gi-Oh! VRAINS is the fifth main spin-off series, which aired for 120 episodes between May 10, 2017 and September 25, 2019, following Yu-Gi-Oh! Arc-V. The series follows a new protagonist named Yusaku Fujiki who engages in duels on a virtual world under the alias "Playmaker", determined to take down an elusive group of hackers known as the "Knights of Hanoi". The series introduces Link Monsters, which are also added to the trading card game.

Yu-Gi-Oh! Sevens

On July 21, 2019, it was announced that a new anime spinoff would premiere sometime in 2020.

On December 21, 2019, the title of the series was revealed to be Yu-Gi-Oh! Sevens, in addition to staff and casting. It premiered on April 4, 2020. For the first time since the 1998 Yu-Gi-Oh! series, the anime will not be animated by Gallop, with Bridge taking over as head studio in animation production.

Yu-Gi-Oh! Go Rush!!

On December 18, 2021, it was announced that a new anime spinoff, titled "Yu-Gi-Oh Go Rush!", would premiere on April 3, 2022.

Trading card game

The Yu-Gi-Oh! Trading Card Game is a Japanese collectible card battle game developed and published by Konami. Based on the Duel Monsters concept from the original manga series, the game sees players using a combination of monsters, spells, and traps to defeat their opponent. First launched in Japan in 1999, the game has received various changes over the years, such as the inclusion of new monster types to coincide with the release of new anime series. In 2011, Guinness World Records called it the top-selling trading card game in history, with  billion cards sold worldwide.

Video games

There are several video games based on the Yu-Gi-Oh! franchise which are published by Konami, the majority of which are based on the trading card game, and some based on other games that appeared in the manga. Aside from various games released for consoles and handheld systems, arcade machines known as Duel Terminals have been released which are compatible with certain cards in the trading card game. Outside of Konami's titles, Yugi appears as a playable character in the crossover fighting games Jump Super Stars, Jump Ultimate Stars, and Jump Force.

Reception
The manga has sold  million copies. In December 2002, Shonen Jump received the ICv2 Award for "Comic Product of the Year" due to its unprecedented sales numbers and its successfully connecting comics to both the television medium and the Yu-Gi-Oh! collectible card game; one of the top CCG games of the year. In August 2008, TV Tokyo reported that over  billion Yu-Gi-Oh! cards had been sold worldwide. By 2011, it had sold  billion cards worldwide.

John Jakala of Anime News Network reviewed the Yu-Gi-Oh! manga in 2003 as part of reviewing the U.S. Shonen Jump. Jakala said that while the commercials for the second series anime made the anime appear "completely uninteresting," the comic "is unexpectedly dark and moody." Jakala added that at one moment the series "reminded me of Neil Gaiman's work: Yugi finds himself drawn into a magical world of ancient forces where there are definite rules that must be obeyed." Jakala concluded that the fact the series uses games as plot devices "opens up a lot of story possibilities" and that he feared that the series had the potential to "simply devolve into a tie-in for the popular card game."

Jason Thompson, the editor of the English version of the manga, ranked Yu-Gi-Oh! as number three of his five personal favorite series to edit, stating that he thinks "the story is actually pretty solid for a shonen manga" and that "you can tell it was written by an older man because of the obsession with death, and what might come after death, which dominates the final story arc," enjoying all the RPG and card gaming terminology found within the series.

Lisa Takeuchi Cullen argued that the manga series started to garner more popularity among Japanese children with the second series because of its somewhat "dark story lines, leggy girls and terrifying monsters". Cullen speculated that the series was not popular among Japanese parents, due to it being more intended for teenagers than the young kids that make up the audience for franchises such as Pokémon.

Yu-Gi-Oh! was used by Bandai as part of their Candy Toy toyline.

References

External links

 
 
 Official Toei Animation Yu-Gi-Oh! website 
 Konami Yu-Gi-Oh! website 
 

Yu-Gi-Oh!
1990s toys
1996 manga
1998 Japanese television series debuts
1998 Japanese television series endings
1998 anime television series debuts
Adventure anime and manga
Anime series
Anime series based on manga
Card games in anime and manga
Egyptian mythology in anime and manga
Films with screenplays by Toshiki Inoue
Films with screenplays by Yasuko Kobayashi
Mythopoeia
School life in anime and manga
Science fantasy anime and manga
Shueisha franchises
Shueisha manga
Shōnen manga
TV Asahi original programming
Toei Animation films
Toei Animation television
Viz Media manga
Works about card games